A War Story Book I is the second studio album by American hip hop group Psycho Realm. Unlike their first album this was released under their own Sick Symphonies label. This CD only contains one song with B-Real, unlike their first CD where B-Real was on most of the songs. This was due to his commitment to Cypress Hill and was no longer able to collaborate with the Psycho Realm. On this album they only have two featured guests: Crow from the Street Platoon and of course B-Real on "Show Of Force".

Track listing

Personnel
Joaquin Gonzalez - vocals, producer, mixing
Gustavo Gonzalez - vocals (tracks: 1-2, 4-11), producer
Louis Freese - vocals (track 12), producer
Carlos Vargas - vocals (tracks: 7-8), co-producer (tracks: 7-8)
Menno - additional vocals, guitar, keyboards
Eric Lance Correa - percussion
Jay Turner - scratches
David Cheppa - mastering
Joe Warlick - mixing

References

2000 albums
Psycho Realm albums